Dudley Township is one of the fifteen townships of Hardin County, Ohio, United States. As of the 2010 census the population was 1,438, up from 1,257 at the 2000 census.

Geography
Located in the southeastern part of the county, it borders the following townships:
Goshen Township - north
Grand Township, Marion County - northeast corner
Montgomery Township, Marion County - east
Bowling Green Township, Marion County - southeast
Hale Township - south
Buck Township - west
Pleasant Township - northwest

No municipalities are located in Dudley Township, although the unincorporated community of Hepburn lies in the township's north.

Name and history
Dudley Township was established in the 1830s, and named for Moses Dudley, a pioneer settler. It is the only Dudley Township statewide.

Government
The township is governed by a three-member board of trustees, who are elected in November of odd-numbered years to a four-year term beginning on the following January 1. Two are elected in the year after the presidential election and one is elected in the year before it. There is also an elected township fiscal officer, who serves a four-year term beginning on April 1 of the year after the election, which is held in November of the year before the presidential election. Vacancies in the fiscal officership or on the board of trustees are filled by the remaining trustees.

References

External links
County website

Townships in Hardin County, Ohio
1830s establishments in Ohio
Townships in Ohio